Teply Klyuch Airport  is an airport serving the urban locality of Khandyga, Tomponsky District, in the Sakha Republic of Russia.

External links

References

  

Airports built in the Soviet Union
Airports in the Sakha Republic